Overstone Park School is a private co-educational day school near Northampton, England, for pupils aged 3 months to 18 years.

School
The school was established in 1983 by husband and wife Corville Oliver Brown and Marion Faith Brown. Mrs. Brown is now the Principal of the school, while Mr. Brown is the Bursar. The school is housed in a purpose-built building on a  site in the  Overstone country park in Northamptonshire. The school comprises four departments: the nursery (3 months – 2 years); pre-preparatory school (2–4 years); preparatory school (4–10 years); high school (10–18 years). The school has a Christian foundation. There are sixty-five boys and forty-one girls enrolled at the school.

Notable former pupils

VV Brown: singer and daughter of Corville and Marion Brown, burser and principal of the school.

References

External links

Private schools in West Northamptonshire District
Educational institutions established in 1983

1983 establishments in England